The Power Mac G5 is a series of personal computers designed, manufactured, and sold by Apple Computer, Inc. from 2003 to 2006 as part of the Power Mac series.  When introduced, it was the most powerful computer in Apple's Macintosh lineup, and was marketed by the company as the world's first 64-bit desktop computer.  It was also the first desktop computer from Apple to use an anodized aluminum alloy enclosure, and one of only three computers in Apple's lineup to utilize the PowerPC 970 CPU, the others being the iMac G5 and the Xserve G5.

Three generations of Power Mac G5 were released before it was discontinued as part of the Mac transition to Intel processors, making way for its replacement, the Mac Pro. The Mac Pro retained a variation of the G5's enclosure design for seven more years, making it among the longest-lived designs in Apple's history.

Introduction 
Officially launched as part of Steve Jobs' keynote presentation at the Worldwide Developers Conference in June 2003, the Power Mac G5 was introduced with three models, sharing the same physical case, but differing in features and performance. Although somewhat larger than the G4 tower it replaced, the necessity for a complex cooling system meant that the G5 tower had room inside for only one optical drive and two hard drives.

Steve Jobs stated during his keynote presentation that the Power Mac G5 would reach 3 GHz "within 12 months." This would never come to pass; after three years, the G5 only reached 2.7 GHz before it was replaced by the Intel Xeon-based Mac Pro, which debuted with processors running at speeds of up to 3 GHz.

During the presentation, Apple also showed Virginia Tech's Mac OS X computer cluster supercomputer (a.k.a. supercluster) known as System X, consisting of 1,100 Power Mac G5 towers operating as processing nodes. The supercomputer managed to become one of the top five supercomputers that year. The computer was soon dismantled and replaced with a new cluster made of an equal number of Xserve G5 rack-mounted servers, which also used the G5 chip running at 2.3 GHz.

PowerPC G5 and the IBM partnership 

The PowerPC G5 (called the PowerPC 970 by its manufacturer, IBM) is based upon IBM's 64-bit POWER4 microprocessor. At the Power Mac G5's introduction, Apple announced a partnership with IBM in which IBM would continue to produce PowerPC variants of their POWER processors. According to IBM's Dr. John E. Kelly, "The goal of this partnership is for Apple and IBM to come together so that Apple customers get the best of both worlds, the tremendous creativity from the Apple corporation and the tremendous technology from the IBM corporation. IBM invested over $3 billion US dollars in a new lab to produce these large, 300 mm wafers." This lab was a completely automated facility located in East Fishkill, New York, and figured heavily in IBM's larger microelectronics strategy.

The original PowerPC 970 had 50 million transistors and was manufactured using IBM CMOS 9S at 130 nm fabrication process. CMOS 9S is the combination of SOI, low-k dielectric insulation, and copper interconnect technology, which were invented at IBM research in the mid-1990s. Subsequent revisions of the "G5" processor have included IBM's PowerPC 970FX (same basic design on a 90 nm process), and the PowerPC 970MP (essentially two 970FX cores on one die). Apple refers to the dual-core PowerPC 970MP processors as either the "G5 Dual" (for single-socket, dual-core configurations), or Power Mac G5 Quad (for dual-socket, four-core configurations).

Architecture 

The Power Mac G5 line in 2006 consisted of three, dual-core PowerPC G5 configurations, which can communicate through its HyperTransport at half its internal clock speed. Each processor in the Power Mac G5 has two unidirectional 32-bit pathways: one leading to the processor and the other from the processor. These result in a total bandwidth of up to 20 GB/s. The processor at the heart of the Power Mac G5 has a "superscalar, superpipelined" execution core that can handle up to 216 in-flight instructions, and uses a 128-bit, 162-instruction SIMD unit (AltiVec).

All modern 32-bit x86 processors since the Pentium Pro have the Physical Address Extension (PAE) feature, which permits them to use a 36-bit physical memory address to address a maximum of 236 bytes (64 gigabytes) of physical memory, while the PowerPC 970 processor is capable of addressing 242 bytes (4 terabytes) of physical memory and 264 bytes (16 exabytes) of virtual memory. Due to its 64-bit processor (and 42-bit MMU), the final revision of the Power Mac G5 can hold 16 GB of Dual-Channel DDR2 PC4200 RAM using eight memory slots, with support for ECC memory.

Product revision history 

 2003 June: Initial release at speeds of Single 1.6, Single 1.8, Dual 2.0 GHz.
 2003 November: Dual 1.8 replaces Single 1.8 GHz; price reduction on Single 1.6 GHz.
 2004 June: 90 nm Dual 1.8, Dual 2.0 and Dual 2.5 GHz replace all previous models. The 2.5 GHz model is notable as the first major PC with liquid cooling included as stock.
 2004 October: A new Single 1.8 reintroduced, with a slower, 600 MHz HyperTransport, PCI bus, based upon the iMac G5's architecture (U3lite and Shasta chips). Apple's official name for this machine is "Power Mac G5 (Late 2004)".
 2005 April: CPU speed increased: Dual 2.5 GHz → Dual 2.7 GHz (PCI-X, LC), Dual 2.0 GHz → Dual 2.3 GHz (PCI-X), Dual 1.8 GHz → Dual 2.0 GHz (PCI). Newly introduced features were the 16x dual-layer SuperDrives across the line and increased storage, up to 800 GB for the higher-end models. The 1.8 GHz Single was not modified.
 2005 June–July: The Single 1.8 model was discontinued in the United States and Europe.
 2005 October: Shift to dual-core processors: Dual 2.0 GHz → DC 2.0 GHz, Dual 2.3 GHz → DC 2.3 GHz, Dual 2.7 GHz → Dual DC 2.5 GHz (termed a Quad Power Mac G5, with four CPU execution cores and more reliable liquid cooling), all with DDR2 memory, and PCI Express expansion in place of PCI-X. The older PCI-X, Dual 2.7 GHz model remained available for a while, but the slower speed single-core models were discontinued immediately.
 2006 August: The Power Mac is replaced by its Intel successor, the Mac Pro.

Technical specifications 
All are obsolete.

Defects 

Early versions of dual processor G5 computers have noise problems. The first one is ground loop-based interference, which sometimes causes noise leaks into the analog audio outputs. This bug was fixed in Rev. B G5.

The second noise problem came from the 'chirping' sound, which can be triggered by fluctuations in power draw. For example, using Exposé causes a brief chirp. A widely circulated work-around is to disable the CPUs' "nap" feature using Apple's CHUD Tools, but this was not recommended by Apple. This noise problem was not fixed until the dual core generation of G5s was produced, however it did not affect the "Late 2004" model (at least there have never been any reports). The power draw fluctuation was later attributed to the lack of power management features in the single-core processors. Apple eventually posted the chirping bug information on its support site.

Although the noise problems did not prevent the affected computers from working, they were problematic for audio professionals and enthusiasts, especially for the liquid-cooled models, which had been expressly designed as mechanically quiet for discerning listeners.

A common problem among single processor G5s was that the plate of metal soldered to the Logic Board connecting all eight of the RAM slots would, over time, expand and contract in such a way that the computer could not boot properly, as it would not detect any RAM. The only way known to fix this problem is for someone to re-solder the plate themselves or expose the other side of the Logic Board to heat from a heat gun. The latter of these two options is far easier, as to access the plate of metal one would have to completely remove the Logic Board from the computer, whereas all one has to do to expose the other side is remove a fan.

All 2.5 GHz and 2.7 GHz dual processor models and the 2.5 GHz quad-processor model had a liquid cooling system that consisted of a radiator, coolant pump, and heat exchangers bolted to the processors. The cooling system was made by Delphi Automotive, a former Harrison Radiator Division of General Motors. This was a bold step for Apple, and should have allowed the use of very fast processors, giving Apple an advantage in both the performance and reliability race, but the system turned out to be subject to coolant leakage, made worse by the system's use of GM Dexcool coolant, which is more corrosive than regular automotive coolant. If not caught in time, the leakage could destroy the processors, logic board, and even corrode the aluminum casing itself. While leakage was sometimes detectable by drops of green coolant in or beneath the machine, in many  machines the seepage is so slight that it was almost impossible to detect without dismantling the entire computer. Later models (only the 2.7 GHz) were equipped with a Panasonic liquid cooling system which was much more reliable.

The liquid cooling system fits into the case where the heat sinks would normally go, so there is no easy way to distinguish the liquid-cooled versions from the air-cooled, although most, but not all, of the liquid-cooled machines have a sticker inside warning about the possibility of leakage.

P.A. Semi's G5 derivative 
When P.A. Semi announced the preliminary pre-production plan of PWRficient processor, there had been persistent rumors that Apple would prepare for its use in its professional line of personal computers.

In 2006, The Register reported that P.A. Semi had formed a tight relationship with Apple, which would result in P.A. Semi promptly delivering processor chips for Apple's personal computer notebook line and possibly desktops. Even in 2006, Apple did not have a laptop version of the G5 processor. The processor that would run the personal computers was P.A. Semi's preliminarily proposed processor, PWRficient 1682M (PA6T-1682M). The version that would be sampled for pre-production at third quarter of 2006 was a 2 GHz, dual-core CPU with two DDR2 memory controllers, 2 MB of L2 cache, and support for 8 PCI Express lanes. The sampled chip also has lower heat intensity than Intel's Core Duo, which gives off 9–31 W under normal load.

According to The Register article, P.A. Semi executives believed that they were all but assured of winning Apple's contract, and CEO Dan Dobberpuhl thought that Apple's hints of moving to Intel were just a persuading tactic. At the time, the companies were working for PWRficient software.

Despite the advantages of more compatible architecture, Apple moved to the Intel architecture officially for 'performance-per-watt' reasons. However, P.A. Semi would not be able to ship its low-power multicore product in volume until 2007, which, combined with P.A. Semi's status as a start-up company, seems to have been the final blow to the development of Power Mac computers. However, it was also speculated that Apple switched to Intel processor because Apple could no longer abide the constant delays in performance ramp up, desired native Windows compatibility, or it was Apple's strategy to shift its business focus away from desktop computing to iPod (and subsequently iOS) development.

Apple acquired P.A. Semi in 2008, using P.A. Semi's engineering resources to develop ARM CPUs for their iPhone, iPod Touch, iPad, and Apple TV product lines; and would go on to eventually come full circle with these designs replacing Intel chips in Macs in 2020.

The PA6T-1682M processor would later be used by the AmigaOne X1000 personal computer.

Timeline

See also 
 List of Macintosh models grouped by CPU type

Notes

External links 

Ars Technica: Inside the PowerPC 970
Ars Technica: A Brief Look at the PowerPC 970
Ars Technica Review: Power Mac G5 Dual 2.5 GHz
Forevermac.com: The Power Mac G5 Quad Core 2.5 GHz

Macintosh towers
G5
G5
Macintosh case designs
64-bit computers